Wendy Battin (May 27, 1953 - December 21, 2015) was an American poet.

Life
Wendy Battin was born in Wilmington, Delaware and graduated from Cornell University and the University of Washington.  She taught at MIT, Smith College, Syracuse University, Boston University, Connecticut College.

Her work has appeared in Field, Georgia Review, Gettysburg Review, Poetry, The Nation, Mississippi Review, Threepenny Review, and Yale Review.

She was the director of CAPA, the Contemporary American Poetry Archive.

She taught yoga, and lived in Mystic, Connecticut.

Awards
 Fine Arts Work Center Fellowship
 Ingram Merrill Foundation Fellowship
 National Endowment for the Arts Fellowship
 1982 Discovery / The Nation Award
 1983 National Poetry Series, for Solar Wind
 Richard Snyder Memorial Prize, for Little Apocalypse

Works
"One Man Watches a Horse Race"; "Coelacanth", Eclectica
"The Women on the Ward", Eclectica
"THE NEWS FROM MARS", The Blue Moon Review 
"News and Sundries", Blue Penny Quarterly, Fall 1995 
"Seven", fieralingue 
"And the Two Give Birth to the Myriad of Things",  fieralingue 
"Mercy 1"; "Mir, the World, or is it Peace", Hamilton Stone Review
"Eve, Before"; "Drosophila"; "The Two of Cups"; "Triptych", Kimera: A Journal of Fine Writing 
"On a Line by Su Tung-p'o"; "Another Line from Su Tung-p'o"; "A Contract"; "Aubade: How Truth Will Out", Mississippi Review 
"Liberty", Salt River Review
"Kali Yuga", Tattoo Highway
"Silver"; "Aubade, The Truth Will Out"; "One Man Watches a Racehouse"; "Seven"; "How Nothing Happens"; "The Telling", Pares, University of Chile

Anthologies

References

External links
"Author's website"

Living people
Poets from Delaware
1953 births
Cornell University alumni
University of Washington alumni
Smith College faculty
Massachusetts Institute of Technology faculty
Syracuse University faculty
Boston University faculty
Connecticut College faculty
American women poets
People from Wilmington, Delaware
People from Mystic, Connecticut
American women academics
21st-century American women